Edmund Salusbury Ffoulkes (12 January 1819 – 19 April 1894) was a British clergyman who converted from Anglicanism to Catholicism and back again in the 19th century.

Biography
Ffoulkes was the son of John Powell Foulkes and Caroline Mary Jocelyn. His father was heir to the Eriviat estates which the ffoulkes family had owned since at least the 16th century. He was christened 21 January 1819 at Henllan, Denbigh, he was educated at Shrewsbury School and Jesus College, Oxford. His uncle, Henry Foulkes was principal of the college from 1817 to 1857. He obtained a second-class degree in Literae Humaniores in 1841.  He became a Fellow of Jesus College in 1843, holding this position until 1855. He was ordained as a priest in the Church of England and also served for a time as the college's Junior Bursar.  He joined the Roman Catholic Church in 1855. However, after fifteen years in the Catholic Church, he applied to his Bishop, Samuel Wilberforce, to be reinstated as a clergyman in the Church of England, and his request was granted.  Jesus College appointed him as rector of Wigginton, Oxfordshire in 1876.  When the position of vicar of the University Church of St Mary the Virgin in Oxford became vacant in 1878, no Fellow of Oriel College wished to accept the appointment and the position was then offered to Ffoulkes, who had previously assisted at services.

Ffoulkes wrote several theological works, including Christendom's Divisions, The Church's Creed or the Crown's Creed, and The Primitive Consecration of the Eucharistic Oblation.  His final work was The History of St. Mary the Virgin.  He also lectured in Divinity to the non-collegiate students at Oxford.

His son was the historian Charles ffoulkes.

References

19th-century births
1894 deaths
Converts to Anglicanism from Roman Catholicism
Anglican priest converts to Roman Catholicism
Alumni of Jesus College, Oxford
Fellows of Jesus College, Oxford
19th-century English Anglican priests
British theologians
British non-fiction writers
People educated at Shrewsbury School
British male writers
Male non-fiction writers